Maxim Borisov (born 1995) is a Russian ITHF table hockey player. He is a double world champion.

References 

Table hockey players
1995 births
Living people